A zoospore is a motile asexual spore that uses a flagellum for locomotion. Also called a swarm spore, these spores are created by some protists, bacteria, and fungi to propagate themselves.

Diversity

Flagella types
Zoospores may possess one or more distinct types of flagella - tinsel or "decorated", and whiplash, in various combinations.

Tinsellated (straminipilous) flagella have lateral filaments known as mastigonemes perpendicular to their main axis, which allow for more surface area, and disturbance of the medium, giving them the property of a rudder, that is, used for steering. 
Whiplash flagella are straight, to power the zoospore through its medium. Also, the "default" zoospore only has the propelling, whiplash flagella.

Both tinsel and whiplash flagella beat in a sinusoidal wave pattern, but when both are present, the tinsel beats in the opposite direction of the whiplash, to give two axes of control of motility.

Morphological types

In eukaryotes, the four main types of zoospore are illustrated in Fig. 1 at right:
 Posterior whiplash flagella are a characteristic of the Chytridiomycota, and a proposed uniting trait of the opisthokonts, a large clade of eukaryotes containing animals and fungi. Most of these have a single posterior flagellum (Fig. 1a), but the Neocallimastigales have up to 16 (Fig. 1b).
 Anisokonts are biflagellated zoospores with two whip types flagella of unequal length (Fig. 1c). These are found in some of the Myxomycota and Plasmodiophoromycota.
 Zoospores with a single anterior flagellum (Fig. 1d) of the tinsel type are characteristic of Hyphochytriomycetes. 
 Heterokont are biflagellated zoospores (Fig. 1e, f) with both whiplash (smooth) and tinsel type (fine outgrowths called mastigonemes) flagella attached anteriorly or laterally. These zoospores are characteristic of the Oomycota and other heterokonts.

Zoosporangium
A zoosporangium is the asexual structure (sporangium) in which the zoospores develop in plants, fungi, or protists (such as the Oomycota).

See also

Angiosperm
Fern
Gametangium

References

External links

Mycology
Fungal morphology and anatomy